Lucius Postumius Albinus may refer to:

Lucius Postumius Albinus (consul 234 BC)
Lucius Postumius Albinus (consul 173 BC)
Lucius Postumius Albinus (consul 154 BC)